George Matthews Modlin (July 13, 1903 – October 4, 1998) was president of the University of Richmond from 1946 to 1971.  He then served as chancellor of the university until 1986 and chancellor emeritus until his death in 1998.

The George M. Modlin Fine Arts Building at the University of Richmond, opened in 1968, was named in his honor upon his retirement in 1971. In 1994, the building was renamed the Booker Hall of Music as the University prepared to expand the fine arts complex.  The entire project, opened in 1996, then became known as the George M. Modlin Center for the Arts.

Education
Modlin received his Bachelor of Arts degree in history from Wake Forest University in 1924 and his Master of Arts (1925) and Ph.D. (1932) in economics from Princeton University.

Academic appointments
In his early career, Modlin taught economics at Princeton and at Rutgers University.  In 1938, he became dean of the Evening School of Business Administration and chairman of the Department of Economics at the University of Richmond.  In 1946, he assumed the presidency of the University of Richmond, and remained in that position until 1971.  He continued to remain associated with the university as chancellor and chancellor emeritus until his death in 1998.

References

External links
History of the University of Richmond: People: Dr. George Matthews Modlin

1998 deaths
Presidents of the University of Richmond
Wake Forest University alumni
Princeton University alumni
Year of birth unknown
1903 births
People from Elizabeth City, North Carolina
Princeton University faculty
Rutgers University faculty
20th-century American academics